John Cave (1948–2010) was an Australian singer.

John Cave may also refer to:

Sir John Charles Cave, 5th Baronet (1958–2018), High Sheriff of Devon (2005), of the Cave baronets
John Cave (rugby union) on List of England national rugby union players

See also

Cave (surname)